Shin Kyuk-ho (3 November 192119 January 2020), known in Japan as Takeo Shigemitsu, was a South Korean businessman known for being the founder of the South Korean-Japanese conglomerate Lotte Corporation, one of the largest chaebols in South Korea.

Career 
Shin was born in Ulsan, Korea in 1921. He was the first of five sons and five daughters. Among his siblings were Shin Choon-ho, founder of South Korean food conglomerate Nongshim. In 1941, he stowed away on a ship to Japan, where he studied chemical engineering at Waseda Jitsugyo High school. He adopted the Japanese name Takeo Shigemitsu and opened a rice cooker manufacturing plant in 1942. After the plant was destroyed during an air raid, Shin was rendered an unemployed college graduate until he founded Lotte in 1948. Lotte was expanded to South Korea in 1967. It grew from selling chewing gum to becoming a major multinational corporation.

In 2006, Shin and his family were ranked 136th on Forbes magazine's list, "The World's Billionaires." In 2009, Shin was ranked 38th on the magazine's list of South Korea's richest people. Lotte itself was South Korea's fifth largest conglomerate as of 2017.

In June 2017, Shin retired from his role as board director of Lotte Holdings Co. after holding the position for nearly 70 years.

In December 2017, he was sentenced to four years in prison after he was convicted of embezzling 128.6 billion won (119 million USD) from Lotte. However, Shin was allowed to remain free given his poor health.

Personal life

Shin had a total of four children from three marriages. His first wife, Noh Soon-hwa, died in 1949. They had one daughter, Shin Young-ja (born 1944). Shin then married a Japanese woman, Hatsuko Shigemitsu, in 1952 under the common-law marriage system. They had two sons, Shin Dong-joo (born 1954) and Shin Dong-bin (born 1956). Shin was also married to Seo Mi-Kyung in South Korea under the country's common-law marriage system. They had one daughter, Shin Yu-mi (born 1982). Because of this bigamic common-law marriage status, some regard Seo Mi-Kyung as a concubine of Shin Kyuk-ho. Shin Dong-bin, second son of Shin Kyuk-ho and Hatsuko Shigemitsu, referred to Seo Mi-Kyung as "My father's girlfriend".

See also
 Lotte

References

1921 births
2020 deaths
Japanese chief executives
Japanese company founders
Japanese people of South Korean descent
Korean emigrants to Japan
Lotte Corporation
Naturalized citizens of Japan
People from Ulsan
South Korean chief executives
South Korean company founders
Yeongsan Shin clan
Zainichi Korean people
People convicted of embezzlement
Japanese fraudsters
South Korean fraudsters
Shin family